Painted Youth is a 1929 German silent drama film directed by Carl Boese and starring Toni van Eyck, Wolfgang Zilzer, and Olga Limburg. It was shot at the National Studios in Berlin. The film's sets were designed by Karl Machus.

Cast

References

Bibliography

External links

1929 films
Films of the Weimar Republic
German silent feature films
Films directed by Carl Boese
National Film films
German black-and-white films
1929 drama films
German drama films
1920s German films